The following is a list of Miss Earth titleholders from the competition's inaugural edition in 2001 to present.

Miss Earth titleholders

Table notes:

Back-to-back wins have been achieved by only one country: Philippines in 2014 and 2015.

Countries by number of wins

Continents by number of wins

Assumed wins 
Titles assumed following resignations.

Resigned wins

See also
 List of Miss International titleholders
 List of Miss Universe titleholders
 List of Miss World titleholders
 Big Four international beauty pageants

References

External links

Miss Earth Foundation website

Miss Earth
Miss Earth titleholders
Miss Earth titleholders